Baumia is a genus of flowering plants belonging to the family Orobanchaceae.

Its native range is Angola.

Species:

Baumia angolensis

References

Orobanchaceae
Orobanchaceae genera